The FAB-250 is a Soviet-designed  general purpose air-dropped bomb with a high-explosive warhead, primarily used by the Russian Air Force, former Soviet republics and customer Countries. It is very widespread throughout the Third World and used in many conflicts in Asia and Africa among others.
The original M-46 model was rolled out in 1946, followed by the M-54 model 1954 with reinforced structure, both models shaped for internal carriage by heavy bombers, a low-drag M-62 version in 1962 was intended for fighter bomber external hardpoint carriage. The bomb is unguided, features a single nose fuse, and is compatible with most models of Soviet aircraft. The FAB-250 was largely employed over Afghanistan by Soviet and allied Afghan forces during the 1980s. The FAB-250 has been used most recently over Syria by both Russian and Syrian warplanes.
Ethiopia uses it during the Tigray War.

Variants
 FAB-250 M-46 - 1946 model, original high-drag model intended for internal carriage on heavy bombers, thin walls.
 FAB-250 M-54 - 1954 model, improved high-drag model with reinforced structure.
 FAB-250 M-62 - 1962 model, low-drag model designed for external carriage on hardpoints on fighter-bombers.

See also
FAB-500
Mark 82 bomb - American counterpart

References

Aerial bombs of Russia
Cold War aerial bombs of the Soviet Union
Weapons and ammunition introduced in 1946